HMS Lennox was a  built for the Royal Navy during the 1910s.

Description
The Laforey class were improved and faster versions of the preceding . They displaced . Lennox was powered by two Parsons direct-drive steam turbines, each driving one propeller shaft, using steam provided by four Yarrow boilers. The ships' complement was 74 officers and ratings.

The ships were armed with three single QF  Mark IV guns and two QF 1.5-pounder (37 mm) anti-aircraft guns. These latter guns were later replaced by a pair of QF 2-pounder (40 mm) "pom-pom" anti-aircraft guns. The ships were also fitted with two above-water twin mounts for  torpedoes. They were equipped with rails to carry four Vickers Elia Mk IV mines, although these rails were never used.

Construction and service

Lennox was laid down at William Beardmore and Company's Clydebank shipyard as Portia on 14 November 1912.  On 30 September 1913, the Admiralty ordered that the L-class be renamed with names beginning with the letter "L", and Portia was renamed Lennox. She was launched on 17 March 1914 on completed in July that year.

On commissioning, Lennox joined the 3rd Destroyer Flotilla,  based at The Nore. On the outbreak of the First World War this Flotilla became part of the Harwich Force, under the overall command of Commodore Reginald Tyrwhitt, serving in the North Sea, but capable of reinforcing either the Grand Fleet or forces in the English Channel as required. Lennox saw action in several engagements, including the Battle off Texel. Damage was insignificant for both ships, however.

Notes

Bibliography
 
 
 
 

 
 
 
 

 

Laforey-class destroyers (1913)
1914 ships
World War I destroyers of the United Kingdom
Ships built on the River Clyde